Nightmare Academy: Monster Hunters (2007) is a fantasy novel written by Dean Lorey about a boy named Charlie Benjamin and his best friends Theodore Dagget and Violet Sweet. The story focuses on how Charlie and his friends repel the forces of the Named, the most powerful creatures in the Netherworld.

Plot summary 

The novel begins in a small town describing the life of Charlie Benjamin. Charlie has a rare ability to portal monsters from another dimension known as the Nether during his nightmares. His parents are both overprotective and do not want their son bullied because of his early academic history of portaling through creatures during naptime. Mr. and Mrs. Benjamin decide to home school their only son and as a result, Charlie becomes an outcast with no friends in his neighborhood. He continues to unknowingly bring Nethercreatures into his room when he has a nightmare. One night, Charlie brings a Silvertongue into his room. Charlie wakes up before the Silvertoungue kills him, and sees a team of three people, Rex, Tabitha, and Pinch attempting to bring the creature back to where it belongs. After the fight, Charlie's parents meet the team. Pinch explains that Charlie has the Gift, which allows him to open portals into the Nether and bring creatures across them. Charlie's gift is too strong, which can become dangerous. Pinch suggests that Charlie follow them to the Nightmare Division, who will decide what should be done with such a dangerous boy. Charlie's mother reluctantly allows him to go.

At the Nightmare Division, the Director instructs Charlie to open a portal. Charlie proceeds to accidentally open a portal to the Named, which are huge powerful beasts. Chaos ensues, and Barakkas, one of the four named creatures of the nether, reaches out his hand and attempts to enter. Charlie quickly closes the portal, which cuts Barakkas's arm off, including his bracer. After a debate about Reducing (a process that removes IQ points in order to lower gifted peoples power) Charlie, the Headmaster brings him to the Nightmare Academy.

There, Charlie meets two classmates, Theodore and Violet. The school trains two different groups, the Banishers and the Nethermancers. Banishers, like Rex, fight and hold off Nethercreatures whereas Nethermancers, like Tabitha, open portals to send them back. Students who lose their Gift are trained as Facilitators, who provide help to the other two. After meeting the Trout of Truth (a creature that determines whether you are a Banisher or a Nethermancer), Charlie finds out that he is a Double Threat, a combination of both a Banisher and Nethermancer.

Charlie is then taken by the Headmaster to Charlie's old house. Verminion, another of the Named who was portalled to Earth some years ago, kidnaps his parents and tells him to exchange his parents for the bracer. Charlie, Rex, Tabitha, and the Headmaster then go to find the Hags of the Void. The Hags of the Void, in return for Rex's memories of his parents, allow Charlie to go through the Gorgon Maze to find the Shadow(a thing which helps find what you want the most). At the end of the maze, the Shadow fills Charlie, allowing him to find his parents. Charlie's shadow now points to his parents' exact location.

The group tries to find his parents, and arrives in a volcano. Verminion tricks Charlie into opening a portal, allowing Barakkas to enter. After the incident, Charlie, Violet, and Theodore steal Barakkas's bracer from the Nightmare Academy to exchange his parents. Brooke, a Facilitator, tags along, and they manage to bring themselves back to the volcano. Charlie tries to trick Barakkas and Verminion by pretending to exchange himself and the bracer for his parents. Verminion doubts Charlie, and exposes his plan. While Violet and Theodore finds his parents and tries to rescue them, Charlie causes the two Named to fight and flees with Brooke. While they are running, Brooke opens a portal, proving that she still has the Gift. The two jump through the portal back to the Academy.

Meanwhile, Barakkas has his bracer back. Both of the Named reminded each other that they both have to be alive to summon the fifth, more powerful Named with their Artifacts. The Headmaster hides Charlie's parents from the Named, and Charlie, with his two best friends, Theodore and Violet goes into the beach and reiterate how they will be together all the way.

Main characters 

 Charlie Benjamin: As the main protagonist of the story, Charlie has a very powerful Gift. He is a Double Threat in the Nightmare Academy, meaning that he could open portals and fight Nethercreatures although he cannot do both at the same time.
 Theodore Dagget: Theodore is Charlie's friend, and is disappointed when he finds out that he was a Nethermancer rather than a Banisher, which has been his family's occupations for generations. He has an important role in the book for rescuing Charlie's parents with Violet. He believes that boys are way better than girls.
 Violet Sweet: Violet is Charlie's friend, and is also disappointed to see that she is expected to be a Banisher when she believed herself to be a Nethermancer. She is a quiet girl at first who like to draw dragons and tell Theodore that girls are just as good as Boys.
 Rexford Henderson: Rex is a Banisher who goes with Charlie on his journey to rescue Charlie's parents. In the middle of the book, Rex momentarily lost his memories about his parents.
 Tabitha Greenstreet: A Nethermancer, part of the group that helped Charlie rescue Charlie's parents.
 Pinch: Pinch was revealed to be Edward, who in his past was a Double Threat, and opened the portal allowing one of the Named, Verminion, into Earth. Pinch was Reduced after the incident, and has held a grudge against others with the Gift ever since.
 The Headmaster: The headmaster of the Nightmare Academy and is also a Double Threat. She participated in Charlie's journey to save Charlie's parents.
 Brooke Brighton: A very pretty Facilitator of about 15 years old. She is later revealed to still be able to open portals, unlike other facilitators. Charlie is torn between anger at her as she starts out mean to him, and kind feelings as she is the most beautiful girl he's ever seen.

Netherworld Creatures 

 Barakkas the Rager: A giant Satyr-like monster that dwells in the center of the Nether. Prone to violent outbursts, Barakkas is one of the four 'Named' Lords of the Nether. His magic bracer is one of the supremely powerful Artifacts of the Nether.
 Verminion the Deceiver: A giant monster with the body of a Crab, and a head like a Triceratop's. Smart, seductive and a compulsive liar, Verminion is one of the four 'Named' Lords of the Nether. His choker is one of the supremely powerful Artifacts of the Nether.
 Slagguron the Unchanging- One of the Named lords of the Nether. Slagguron is the size of a building, and is the Lord of the Earth. He tunnels through the Nethercrust, which is why the Nightmare Division have never seen him. His Artifact is a large belt around his stomach, the only artifact he can wear because of his shape - Slagguron resembles a worm. Claiming to be "unchanging as the rock he burrows through", he is later revealed to be a changeling - a beast that can change shape for a short period of time. He pretends to be a child, stranded in the Nether, which is how he tricks Charlie into letting him out.
 Tyrannus the Demented- The Fourth Named, the Lord of the Air. Tyrannus resembles a gigantic bat, so is easily the fastest Named. He gets nethercreatures to steal children and bring them to the Guardian, as a touch from a human kills it. The guardian protects the anomaly, a massive portal out of the Nether. Eventually, he gets out through it. His artifact is a massive ring. Tyrannus is insane, Hence his name.
 Hags: Hideous female Demon-like creatures with green skin. Filthy, winged creatures that think they're beautiful. They live in the ruins of a crumbling manor deep in a part of the Nether called "The Void". They are known to guard "The Shadow", a strange power that allows those to find the one thing that they want most. They have the ability to suck the memories of a person's brain, considering it their favorite Dish.
 Silvertongue: Scorpion-like creatures with tuning fork-shaped tongues with the small abilities to make a person's head explode.
 Netherstalker: Spider-like creatures with snail-like eyes, it is considered the smartest creatures of the Nether, and lieutenants of the 'Named'. It is later learned in the book that the number of eye-stalks represents its level.
 Gorgon: With greenish, snake-like skin, a forked tongue, snakes for hair, fangs, and its entire lower half a snake's tail, it has the power to turn anything that looks into its eyes into solid Marble. They live in the Gorgon Maze, accessible only through the mansion of the Hags of "The Void".
 Snark: A small creature that resembles a ball of fur with big eyes and a little beak. it has the uncanny ability to feed on fear, growing larger and fiercer. They appear to be harmless in their normal state.
 Ectobog: A Slime mold-like creature with the ability to sub-divide, smothering its prey. It detests the light.
 Gremlins: Mischievous and plentiful on the first ring of the Nether. Gremlins eat electricity, often destroying entire power grids if allowed to Earth. It is considered to be in a different class from the other creatures, since it doesn't grow any larger.
 NetherBat- A large Bat-like creature from the Netherworld. Rex and Tabitha used flour to blind its sonar, sending it back to the Netherworld.
 Mimic- A large slug-like creature with no mouth and a two long arm and fingers. It has the ability to morph into whatever shape it wants, as long as the original is still alive. It feeds on Sweat, and since it has no mouth, it must morph to eat. Mimics give of the scent of Cinnamon, even when it is in disguise. Water is the only thing that can expose the Mimic. A Mimic's class can be identified for how many fingers it has.
 Professor Xixclix- A Class four Netherstalker that is slowly growing into a Class five. He is one of few Netherworld creatures that have joined with the humans. He is in charge with handling the captured creatures used for Banisher training.
 Netherleaper- Large kangaroo like creatures that can leap kilometers into the air. Violet was kidnapped by one at the beginning of the second book, in a cunning plot which is revealed later on in the story. Netherleapers is their correct term, but Rex prefers to call the "Dangeroos".
 Jellybangs- These creatures look almost exactly like Jellyfish, but their main difference is size. So big that Charlie, Violet, Theodore and Pinch were able to fit on one in their quest to find the Mother Hydra. Their stingers are so powerful that they can paralyze you, but this is not their only defense - they can explode. They sacrifice themselves to destroy predators. Rather simple creatures, they simply propel themselves towards food or away from danger.
 Darkling- Monsters that resemble octopuses, except that they are black. Darklings absorb most of the light in any room, so if you have a darkling, light will be a problem. The easiest way to kill them is by exposing them to light.
 Hydra- A monster from Greek legend. These creatures have six heads, each just as deadly as the other. As babies, they are the size as bears. The only time we have seen them are in the fourth ring of the Nether. Only one female hydra exists, and is as big as a whale. Female hydra milk possesses an incredible power - it restores a person to the time when they were most powerful.
 Acidspitter- Hence the name, this creature possesses the talent of spitting acid. One of these creatures was the cause of the death of Sir Goodnight, the director before Director Drake.
 The Guardian- One of the only good creatures of the Nether, aside from Professor Xixclix. He gives off an aura poisonous to Nethercreatures, and protects the Anomaly with it. The Anomaly is a large portal to Earth, and comes out in the Bermuda Triangle - which is why ships and planes have disappeared in it. The aura of the guardian has soaked onto the ships in the BT graveyard (Bermuda Triangle graveyard), so the Headmaster has taken them and made the Nightmare Academy out of them. This means that the Nightmare Academy is protected from Nethercreatures. Humans are considered poisonous to him, as it can heavily weaken or kill him.

Ranks 

 Noobs- (Stands for "Newbie") The beginning rank for new academy students. The Noobs are usually given the junkiest weapons and smallest assignments. To find out whether the Noob is a Banisher or a Nethermancer, the student goes to the Trout of Truth and shout what they think they are. If the Trout finds their statement false he will eat the student then spit him/her out. If the statement is the truth it will not eat the student.
 Addys (Stands for "adequate") the second rank for academy students. Charlie and his friends take their tests for promotion to Addy after six months at the academy.
 Leets (Stands for "elite").

As said by the lady Headmaster: "Once students have demonstrated a significant amount of skill, you will be known as Leets, meaning 'elite. '" -The Headmaster

Film adaptation 

A movie based on Nightmare Academy was planned to be released in 2008. The rights to the movie were bought by Universal Studios, and the release date may be changed in the future. The film was being written by David Reynolds.

References 

Universal has purchased the film rights to the book and the producers will be Stephen Sommers and Bob Ducsay, who worked on movies such as The Mummy.

External links 
 Dean Lorey Official Website
 Harper Collins Nightmare Academy Website

2007 American novels
American fantasy novels
HarperCollins books